Barsacq is a French surname. Notable people with the surname include:

André Barsacq (1909–1973), French theatre director
Léon Barsacq (1906–1969), Russian-born French production designer
Marie Amachoukeli-Barsacq (born 1979), French film director
Yves Barsacq (1931–2015), French film actor

See also
Barsac (disambiguation)

French-language surnames